Gordon Connell (March 19, 1923 – June 12, 2016) was an American actor, singer, and dancer.

Personal life
Born William Gordon Connell in Berkeley, California, Connell married Jane Sperry Bennett (aka Jane Connell), a fellow actress and singer, also a native of Berkeley  in 1948. They had two daughters. Jane and Gordon began their careers performing at such San Francisco night clubs as The Purple Onion and The Hungry I.

Career
They gravitated to New York City. In the late 1950s and early 1960s, he performed in revues at the Tamiment Playhouse in the Poconos and in several of the Julius Monk nightclub revues at  Upstairs at the Downstairs, including Monk's "Pieces of Eight" and "Dressed to the Nines". He made his Broadway debut in Subways Are For Sleeping in 1961. 

Additional stage credits include Hello, Dolly!, Big River and The Human Comedy. The Connells appeared together on Broadway twice: in a musical version of Lysistrata  (1972) and The Good Doctor (1998). His television credits include Green Acres, The Love Boat, The Jeffersons, The Incredible Hulk, and Sex and the City. His sole feature film appearance was a small role in Roman Polanski's Rosemary's Baby. 

Connell was also a musical theater composer who wrote humorous cabaret songs as well as the score for the award-winning musical Bertha the Sewing Machine Girl.

Death
Jane Connell died on September 22, 2013, at age 87. Gordon Connell died on June 12, 2016, at the age of 93. Both died at Lillian Booth Actors Home of the Actors Fund in Englewood, New Jersey.

Filmography
Rosemary's Baby (1968) - Allen Stone - Guy's Agent (uncredited)

External links
 
 Gordon Connell at Internet Off-Broadway Database
 
 Jane and Gordon Connell papers, 1923-2015, held by the Billy Rose Theatre Division, New York Public Library for the Performing Arts.
 Obituary - New York Times
 Obituary - Broadwayworld

1923 births
2016 deaths
American male musical theatre actors
American male stage actors
American male television actors
Male actors from Berkeley, California